Molla Mahalleh may refer to:
 Molla Mahalleh, Siahkal, Gilan Province
 Molla Mahalleh, Talesh, Gilan Province
 Molla Mahalleh-ye Chehel Setun, Gilan Province
 Molla Mahalleh, Babol, Mazandaran Province
 Molla Mahalleh, Nur, Mazandaran Province